This is a list of Pocket PC devices, and companies that make, or have made, them.

Ocean PDA
 K1
 K2
 Designer
 PocketPaq
 K2 Sport
 K3

Ocean's Pocket PC devices are focused on kid entertainment. Ocean's K Line moved to Windows Mobile for Ocean PDA Limited (now a Public Limited Company) to focus on the smartphone business instead.

Acer

Acer F Series
 f900

Acer C500 Series (integrated GPS)
 c510
 c530
 c531
 Ferrari Racing

Acer N Series

 n10
 n30
 n50
 n35 (integrated GPS)
 n300
 n310
 n311
 n320

ASUS

 MyPal A600
 MyPal A620
 MyPal A620BT
 MyPal A626
 MyPal A632
 MyPal A636
 MyPal A636N
 MyPal A632N
 MyPal A639
 MyPal A686
 MyPal A696
 MyPal A716
 MyPal A730
 MyPal A730W
 P505
 P525
 P535
 P735
 P565

Audiovox (now UTStarcom)
 Thera - Pocket PC with built-in CDMA Verizon cellphone
 PPC-6600/6601 - HTC Harrier (CDMA)
 PPC-6700 - HTC Apache (CDMA)
 PPC4100 - GSM/GPRS Pocket PC phone
 PPC-6800 - HTC Mogul (CDMA)
 PPC-6900 - HTC Touch (CDMA)

Binatone

Binatone Carrera (GPS)
 X350
 X430

Casio

Cassiopeia
Only the Casio E-115, E-125 and EM-500 were Pocket PCs. All others were using the older "Palm-sized PC" operating system except for the BE-300, which ran a stripped-down version of Windows CE 3.0 and would not run any Pocket PC software and many applications written for Windows CE itself.

 BE-300
 E-100
 E-115
 E-125
 EM-500
 A-22T
 A-10
 A-11

Compaq
 iPAQ

Cowon
 Cowon Q5W

E-TEN
 M600
 G500
 X500 glofiish
 M700 glofiish
 T500
 X800 glofiish

Dell

Dell Axim
 Axim X30
 Axim X5
 Axim X50
 Axim X50v
 Axim X51
 Axim X51v

Dopod
Dopod site

 Dopod C500
 Dopod C730
 Dopod HTC Touch
 Dopod D600
 Dopod M700
 Dopod C720
 Dopod 838 Pro
 Dopod 818Pro
 Dopod C800
 Dopod P800W
 Dopod D810
 Dopod U1000
 Dopod 595
 Dopod 300

Fisher Scientific
 Accumet XL60 pH/mV/DO/ISE/Conductivity/Resistivity/Temperature Meter
 Accumet XL50 pH/mV/ISE/Conductivity/Resistivity/Temperature Meter
 Accumet XL25 pH/mV/ISE/ Meter
 Accumet XL20 pH/mV/Conductivity/Resistivity/Salinity/Temperature Meter
 Accumet XL15 pH/mV/Temperature meter

Fujitsu
 Pencentra 130
 Pencentra 200

Fujitsu-Siemens Computers

 Pocket LOOX 600
 Pocket LOOX 610BT
 Pocket LOOX 610BT/WLAN
 Pocket LOOX 410
 Pocket LOOX 420
 Pocket LOOX 710
 Pocket LOOX 718
 Pocket LOOX 720
 Pocket LOOX N500
 Pocket LOOX N520
 Pocket LOOX N560
 Pocket LOOX C550
 Pocket LOOX N100
 Pocket LOOX N110
 Pocket LOOX T810
 Pocket LOOX T830

Garmin
 iQue M5
 iQue M4
 iQue M3

Hewlett Packard

Jornada

 Jornada 520 series
 Jornada 540 series
 Jornada 560 series
 Jornada 680 series
 Jornada 690 series
 Jornada 710
 Jornada 720
 Jornada 728
 Jornada 820 handheld
 Jornada 928 Wireless Digital Assistant

Note that the 600, 700 and 800 series were handheld PCs that came before the Pocket PC platform was launched.

HP/Compaq iPAQ

 H1900
 H1910
 H1920
 H1930
 H1935
 H1940
 H1945
 H2200
 H3630
 H3670
 H3760
 H3850
 H3870
 H3950
 H3955
 H3970
 H3975
 H4150
 H4155
 H5550
 HP2210
 HX2110
 HX2400 Series
 HX2795
 HX2795b
 HX4700
 HX4705
 RX1950
 RX1955
 RX3115
 RX3715
 RX5910
 RZ1715
 HW6500 Series
 200 Series

Hitachi
 Hitachi G1000

HTC

 HTC Advantage X7500/HTC Athena
 HTC Advantage X7501/HTC Athena
 HTC Advantage X7510
 HTC Alpine
 HTC Amadeus
 HTC Apache
 HTC Artemis/HTC P3300
 HTC Atlas/HTC P4351
 HTC Blue Angel
 HTC Breeze/HTC MTeoR
 HTC Canary
 HTC Cavalier/HTC S630
 HTC Census/HTC P6000
 HTC Charmer
 HTC Cheetah
 HTC Erato/HTC S420
 HTC Excalibur/HTC S620/HTC S621
 HTC Falcon
 HTC Faraday
 HTC Feeler
 HTC Foreseer
 HTC Galaxy
 HTC Gene/HTC P3400i/HTC P3400/HTC P3401
 HTC Gemini
 HTC Harrier
 HTC Herald/HTC P3450
 HTC Hermes
 HTC Himalaya
 HTC Iris/HTC S640
 HTC Kii
 HTC Libra/HTC 5800/HTC S720
 HTC Love/HTC P3350
 HTC Melody/HTC Muse
 HTC Magician
 HTC Monet/HTC S320
 HTC Omni
 HTC Oxygen/HTC S310
 HTC Panda/HTC P6300
 HTC Pharos/HTC P3470
 HTC Prophet
 HTC Robbie
 HTC Rosella/iPAQ H3870/iPAQ H3875
 HTC Sedna/HTC P6500
 HTC Sirius/HTC P6550
 HTC Sonata
 HTC Startrek/HTC S411
 HTC Tanager
 HTC Titan/HTC P4000
 HTC Tornado/HTC Tornado Noble/HTC Tornado Tempo
 HTC Touch/HTC Elf/HTC Ted Baker Needle/HTC Vogue/HTC P3050/HTC P3450/HTC P3452
 HTC Touch Cruise/HTC Touch Find/HTC Polaris/HTC P3650
 HTC Touch Diamond/HTC Victor/HTC P3100/HTC P3700/HTC P3702
 HTC Touch Dual//HTC Nike/HTC P5500
 HTC Touch Find
 HTC Touch HD//HTC Blackstone/HTC T8282
 HTC Touch Pro/HTC Raphael
 HTC Trinity/HTC P3600
 HTC Typhoon
 HTC TyTN/HTC Hermes
 HTC TyTN II/HTC Kaiser
 HTC Vox/HTC S710/HTC S711
 HTC Universal
 HTC Voyager
 HTC Wallaby
 HTC Wave
 HTC Wings/HTC S730
 HTC Wizard/HTC Prodigy/HTC P4300
 HTC P3600i

i-mate
Momento Digital Photo Frame
 Pocket PC
 Ultimate 8150
 Ultimate 8502
 Ultimate 9502

IBM
 Workpad z50

JVC
 MP-PV131 (never released)

Jointech
 J-Pro JL7100 Mini Laptop

Kopin Corporation
 Golden-i Head Mounted Computer

LG
 LN505 GPS Navigator

Linksys
 Linksys WIP-300 VoIP WIFi phone
 Linksys WIP-330 VoIP WIFi phone

Magellan Navigation
 Magellan RoadMate 1200
 Magellan RoadMate 1412
 Magellan RoadMate 5236
 Magellan Maestro 3100
 Magellan Maestro 4210

Meizu
 Meizu M8

Mobile Crossing
 WayPoint 100 includes CF based GPS
 WayPoint 200 Mobile Crossing includes BT based GPS

Motorola

 Motorola ES400
 Motorola FR68
 Motorola MC17
 Motorola MC35
 Motorola MC50
 Motorola MC55
 Motorola MC65
 Motorola MC70
 Motorola MC75
 Motorola MPx200
 Motorola MPx220
 Motorola MPx300
 Motorola i920/i930
 Motorola Vip 1200

MWg
 Atom Life
 Atom V
 MWg Zinc II
 MWg UBiQUiO 503g
 MWg UBiQUiO 501

NAVIGON (Personal Navigation Assistant)
 7100
 5100
 2100

NEC
 Nec MobilePro

NTT DoCoMo
 Sigmarion series

O2

 O2 XDA
 O2 XDA II
 O2 XDA IIi
 O2 XDA IIs
 O2 XDA EXEC
 O2 XDA Atom
 O2 XDA Atom Executive
 O2 XDA Atom Life
 O2 XDA Flame
 O2 XDA Orbit
 O2 XDA Stealth

Opticon
 PHL 5200
 PHL 5400
 PHL 8112

Palm
 Treo 500v
 Treo 700w
 Treo 700wx
 Treo 750
 Treo 750v
 Treo 800w
 Treo Pro

Philips
 Philips Nino - bar-style device with touchscreen
 Philips Velo - small-notebook-style device with monochrome display

None of the Philips devices were pocket PCs. The Nino was a salm-Sized PC that preceded the Pocket PC platform and the Velo was the older still handheld PC platform.

Qtek
 Qtek 1010
 Qtek 2020
 Qtek 2020i
 Qtek 9100

Samsung
 Samsung I700
 Samsung I710
 Samsung I730
 Samsung I740
 Samsung I760
 Samsung I780
 Samsung I900

Sega
 Sega Dreamcast (Windows CE compatible, only used in select titles)

Silvercrest
 Mobile Navigation System PNA-M4310T - a navigation system from the homebrand of Lidl

Siemens
SX56
SX66
P1
 Siemens Sirec D300

Snap-on Tools
 MODIS
 Snap-on SOLUS

Sophia Mobile
nani

Sutron Corporation
 Xpert Datalogger

Takara
GPV1004
GPV1007
GPV1207
GPV1208

ThinCCo
 Tisio 90CE
 Tisio 95CE
 Tisio 96CE
 Tisio 300CE

Trium
 Trium Mondo

Toshiba

 e310
 e330
 e335
 e350
 e355
 e400
 e405
 e450
 e550g
 e570
 e740
 e750
 e755
 e800
 e805
 e830
 g500
 g900

Unitech
 MR650
 PA950
 PA962
 PA966

UTStarcom
 PPC-6700 - HTC Apache
 PPC-6800 - HTC Mogul
 PPC-6900 - HTC Touch

Vadem
 Clio 1000
 Clio 1050
 clio NXT

Vadem devices were not pocket PCs but were the older handheld PC platform.

Viewsonic
 V35
 V36
 V37
 V38

Vivax (available only in Ex-Yu markets)
 viaGPS 350

Yakumo
 deltaX 5 BT
 delta 400

Emulators

Microsoft Windows CE 5.0 Device Emulator (Connectix x86 based)
Microsoft Device Emulator (Custom ARM CE device emulator developed by Microsoft with source code available)
 GXemul (unconfirmed)
Virtio Virtual Platforms (c emulate custom ARM and MIPS based Windows CE devices)
 MESS (with mini2440 ARM devboard driver)

See also
 List of Palm OS devices
 List of Windows Mobile devices

References

Pocket PC devices
 
 
Pocket PC